Colegio Nacional is the short name of several institutions:


Colleges
 Colegio Nacional Enrique Nvó Okenve, a college in Equatorial Guinea
 El Colegio Nacional (Mexico)

High schools
 Colegio Nacional de Buenos Aires, Argentina
 Colegio Nacional de la Capital, Paraguay
 Colegio Nacional de Monserrat, Argentina
 Colegio Nacional de San Isidro, Argentina
 Colegio Nacional de Ushuaia, Argentina

Other
 Colegio Nacional Iquitos, a Peruvian football team

See also
 National school (disambiguation)